Below are the squads for the 2018 AFF Championship, which took place from 8 November to 15 December 2018.

Group A

Vietnam 
Head coach:  Park Hang-seo

The final squad was announced on 3 November 2018.

Malaysia 
Head coach: Tan Cheng Hoe

The final squad was announced on 4 November 2018.

Myanmar 
Head coach:  Antoine Hey

The final squad was announced on 11 November 2018.

Cambodia 
Head coach:  Félix Dalmás

The final squad was announced on 6 November 2018.

Laos 
Head coach:  V. Sundramoorthy

The final squad was announced on 8 November 2018.

Group B

Thailand 
Head coach:  Milovan Rajevac

The final squad was announced on 5 November 2018.

Indonesia 
Head coach: Bima Sakti

The final squad was announced on 3 November 2018.

Philippines 
Head coach:  Sven-Göran Eriksson

The final squad was announced on 13 November 2018.

Singapore 
Head coach: Fandi Ahmad

The final squad was announced on 4 November 2018.

Timor-Leste 
Head coach:  Norio Tsukitate

The final squad was announced on 2 November 2018.

Statistics

Age

Outfield players 
 Oldest:  Beto Gonçalves
Youngest:  Gumario Moreira

Goalkeepers 
 Oldest:  Hassan Sunny
Youngest:  Keo-Oudone Souvannasangso

Captains 
 Oldest:  Chalermpong Kerdkaew
Youngest:  Jorge Victor

Coaches 
 Oldest:  Sven-Göran Eriksson
Youngest:  Félix Dalmás

Player representation by league system

Player representation by club 
Clubs with 6 or more players represented are listed.

Player representation by club confederation

Coaches representation by country 
Coaches in bold represent their own country.

References

External links 
 AFF Suzuki Cup official website
 ASEAN Federation official website

squads
AFF Championship squads